Adelheid (minor planet designation: 276 Adelheid) is a dark Alauda asteroid from the outer region of the asteroid belt, approximately 121 kilometers in diameter. It was discovered by Austrian astronomer Johann Palisa at Vienna Observatory on 17 April 1888. The meaning of the asteroids's name is unknown.

Classification 

Adelheid is a member of the Alauda family, a large family of typically bright carbonaceous asteroids and named after its parent body, 702 Alauda.

Physical characteristics 

Photometric observations in 1992 gave a lightcurve with a period of 6.328 ± 0.012 hours and a brightness variation of 0.10 ± 0.02 in magnitude. The curve is regular with two maxima and minima.

In the Tholen classification, its spectrum has been characterized as that of an X-type asteroid, while polarimetric observations refined its classification to a primitive P-type.

Naming 

Any reference of this minor planet's name to a person or occurrence is unknown.

Unknown meaning 

Among the many thousands of named minor planets, Adelheid is one of 120 asteroids, for which no official naming citation has been published.

References

External links 
 Asteroid Lightcurve Database (LCDB), query form (info )
 Dictionary of Minor Planet Names, Google books
 Asteroids and comets rotation curves, CdR – Observatoire de Genève, Raoul Behrend
 Discovery Circumstances: Numbered Minor Planets (1)-(5000) – Minor Planet Center
 
 

000276
Discoveries by Johann Palisa
Named minor planets
000276
18880417